Séwé Football Club (formerly Séwé Sport de San-Pédro, referred to as Séwé Sport) is an Ivorian football club based in San-Pédro.  They are a member of the Ivorian Football Federation Premiere Division.  They play at the Stade Municipal.

The club rebranded as Séwé FC in March 2017.

Current squad

Honours
Côte d'Ivoire Premier Division
Champions (3): 2011–12, 2012–13, 2013–14

Côte d'Ivoire Cup
Champions: 2016

Coupe Houphouët-Boigny
Champions (4): 2005, 2012, 2013, 2014

Performance in CAF competitions
CAF Champions League: 3 appearances
2007 – First Round
2013 – Group stage (Top 8)
2014 – Second Round
2015 – Preliminary Round

CAF Confederation Cup: 4 appearances
2006 – First Round
2010 – First Round
2011 – Preliminary Round
2012 – Preliminary Round
2014 – Runner-Up
2017 –

References

External links
Fédération Ivoirienne de Football
Footballzz.co.uk
ligue1-ci.com
Séwé Sport San Pedro at National-Football-Teams.com

Football clubs in Ivory Coast
Sports clubs in Ivory Coast
Sport in Bas-Sassandra District
San-Pédro, Ivory Coast
1977 establishments in Ivory Coast
Association football clubs established in 1977